The Kamov Ka-40 is reported to be a new anti-submarine helicopter based on the Ka-27 and has been under development since 1990.

Design and development
The design was based on and fit to replace the Ka-27 with a pointed streamlined nose. Reportedly powered by two 1,838 kW (2,465 shp) Klimov TVA-3000 turboshaft engines, driving a coaxial rotor system. The civil variant could carry a 7,000 kg (15,432 lb) underslung load, while the military naval variant can include an array of ASW weapons and electronics. Armament is expected to include APR-3 water-jet-propelled torpedoes and KAB-250PL guided depth charges.

Although the Ka-40 was proposed for several civil and military roles, development was suspended in 1998.

Specifications
(projected specs)
Engine: 2 x 1,838 kW (2,465shp) Klimov TVA-3000 turboshafts 
Normal Take-off weight: 12,500 kg (27,557 lb)
Max. take-off weight: 14,500 kg (31,967 lb)

References

 Jane's All the World's Aircraft

External links

 KAMOV Ka-40 (Russian Federation), AIRCRAFT - ROTARY-WING - MILITARY　page on janes.com
 page helis.com

1990s Soviet and Russian anti-submarine aircraft
Kamov aircraft
Military helicopters
Coaxial rotor helicopters
Abandoned military aircraft projects of Russia
1990s Soviet and Russian helicopters